Amarita (in Spanish Amárita and officially Amarita, pronounced with the stress on the second a) is a village and city council in the municipality of Vitoria-Gasteiz in the province of Álava, Basque Country, Spain. It is included within the rural area northwest of Vitoria.

Location
Amarita is a village of 39 inhabitants (2008) located 9 km north of the city of Vitoria. It is accessed via local roads and is located near the villages of Mendibil and Arroiabe, belonging to the municipality of Arratzua-Ubarrundia. The village lies along the Santa Engracia river, which empties into the Zadorra River near the village.

History
The first written mention of the village dates back to 1025 when it was mentioned with the name of Hamarita. At that time it belonged to the outskirts of Ubarrundia, along with neighboring villages. In 1332 it was assigned to the town of Vitoria by gift of King Alfonso XI. Since then it has become one of the villages that mark the northern boundary of the municipality of Vitoria.

Monuments

The San Pedro parish church is located in the village. The building is from the nineteenth century and the altarpiece is of a neoclassic style. Some elements of the church are older, such as the tower and the vestry dating from the eighteenth century and the lateral altarpieces are from seventeenth century.

Celebrations
A feast in honour of Saint Peter is celebrated on June 29.

Economy
Agro-tourism is one of the more important contributors to the economy in the village.

References

Populated places in Álava